The M1 Abrams main battle tank has been in service since 1980. Since then, it has gone through dozens of upgrades and been the baseline variant of several vehicles.

Development

The first attempt to replace the M60 Patton was the MBT-70, developed in partnership with West Germany in the 1960s and reaching the testing stage by 1968. The MBT-70 was very ambitious, and had various innovative ideas that ultimately proved unsuccessful. As a result of the imminent failure of this project, the U.S. Army introduced the XM803. This succeeded only in producing an expensive system with capabilities similar to the M60.

Congress canceled the MBT-70 in November and XM803 December 1971. The Army restarted its M60 successor program with Major General William Robertson Desobry leading the team formulating requirements in March 1972. Army officials told congressmen in April that there was little that could be salvaged from the past efforts, and that a new tank would take at least eight years to develop. A Pentagon task force submitted requirements for the tank in January 1973. By April the Pentagon approved the project with Brigadier General Robert. J. Baer as production manager. Desobry told The New York Times, "We ought to be shot if it doesn't work."

The Pentagon's requirements specified a tank gun between 105 and 120-mm and a Bushmaster cannon with a caliber between 20 and 30-mm. Plans called for a tank weighing about 54 tons. By 1973 the Army had settled on buying 3,312 of the new tanks, with production beginning in 1980.

The price of the $3 billion program was assailed by Congressman Les Aspin in July. The Pentagon had projected unit costs were to be less than US$507,000 in 1972 dollars. Aspin argued that were the research and development costs factored in, tanks would actually cost over $900,000 a piece (compared to $1.3 million for the canceled MBT-70). Noting that the M60 Patton cost only $500,000 each, Aspin said, "I'm sure that the Army's new tank is not twice as good as what we have today."

In June the Army awarded competitive three-year contracts - $68 million for Chrysler Corporation and $87 million to General Motors Corporation - for the production of prototypes. In February 1976 the two prototypes were tested at Aberdeen Proving Ground. Chrysler chose a regenerative turbine engine made by Avco Lycoming while General Motors chose a Teledyne Continental diesel engine.

They were armed with the license-built version of the  105 mm Royal Ordnance L7 gun. The Pentagon in 1994 also allowed the West German Leopard 2 to be tested against the American winner at Aberdeen with the understanding that the better tank would be adopted by both countries. However the two nations were unable to reconcile their nationalistic differences, so a compromise was made that would have both tanks share common parts.

In July the Army recommended selecting the General Motors offering, but the recommendation was disregarded by the Pentagon, which asked competitors to modify their proposals to share parts with the German tank. In November the Army selected Chrysler's design. Chrysler's proposal may have been attractive because the company said it could incorporate the Rheinmetall M256 120 mm cannon without increasing costs, weight or the production timeline.

In 1979, General Dynamics Land Systems Division purchased Chrysler Defense.

3,273 M1 Abrams were produced 1979-85 and first entered US Army service in 1980. It was armed with the license-built version of the 105 mm Royal Ordnance L7 gun. An improved model called the M1IP was produced briefly in 1984 and contained small upgrades. The M1IP models were used in the Canadian Army Trophy NATO tank gunnery competition in 1985 and 1987.

About 6,000 M1A1 Abrams were produced from 1986–92 and featured the M256 120 mm smoothbore cannon developed by Rheinmetall AG of Germany for the Leopard 2, improved armor, and a CBRN protection system.

Persian Gulf War

As the Abrams entered service in the 1980s, they would operate alongside M60A3 within the United States military, and with other NATO tanks in numerous Cold War exercises. These exercises usually took place in Western Europe, especially West Germany, but also in some other countries like South Korea. During such training, Abrams crews honed their skills for use against the men and equipment of the Soviet Union. However, by 1991 the Soviet state had collapsed and the Abrams would have its trial by fire in the Middle East.

The Abrams remained untested in combat until the Persian Gulf War in 1991. The M1A1 was superior to Iraq's Soviet-era T-55 and T-62 tanks, as well as Iraqi assembled Russian T-72s, and locally produced copies (Asad Babil tank). The T-72s like most Soviet export designs lacked then-modern night vision systems, though they did  have some night fighting tanks with older active infrared systems or floodlights—just not the latest starlight scopes and passive infrared scopes as on the Abrams.  Some others took minor combat damage, with little effect on their operational readiness. Very few M1 tanks were hit by enemy fire, and none were destroyed as a direct result of enemy fire, with no fatalities due to enemy fire.

This meant Abrams tanks could hit Iraqi tanks before the enemy got in range—a decisive advantage in this kind of combat. In friendly fire incidents, the front armor and fore side turret armor survived direct APFSDS hits from other M1A1s. This was not the case for the side armor of the hull and the rear armor of the turret, as both areas were penetrated at least in two occasions by friendly DU ammunition during the Battle of Norfolk.

On the night of February 26, 1991, four Abrams were disabled, possibly as a result of friendly fire by Hellfire missiles fired from AH-64 Apache attack helicopters, wounding some crew members. The tanks were part of TF 1-37, attacking a large section of Tawakalna Republican Guard Division, their numbers being B-23, C-12, D-24 and C-66. Abrams C-12 was definitively hit and penetrated by a friendly DU shot and there is some evidence that another Iraqi T-72 may have scored a single hit on B-23, besides the alleged Hellfire strike. 

Tanks D-24 and C-66 took some casualties, but only B-23 became a permanent loss. The DoD's damage assessments state that B-23 was the only M1 with signs of a Hellfire missile found nearby.

Also during the Persian Gulf War, three Abrams of the U.S. 24th Infantry Division were left behind the enemy lines after a swift attack on Talil airfield, south of Nasiriyah, on February 27. One of them was hit by enemy fire, the two other embedded in mud. The tanks were destroyed by U.S. forces in order to prevent any trophy-claim by the Iraqi Army.

A total of 23 M1A1s were damaged or destroyed during the war. Of the nine Abrams tanks destroyed, seven were destroyed by friendly fire and two intentionally destroyed to prevent capture by the Iraqi Army. Some others took minor combat damage, with little effect on their operational readiness.

Tank and crew casualties

Interwar upgrades
Following lessons learned in the Persian Gulf War, the Abrams and many other U.S. combat vehicles used in the conflict were fitted with Combat Identification Panels to reduce friendly fire incidents. These were fitted on the sides and rear of the turret, with flat panels equipped with a four-cornered 'box' image on either side of the turret front (these can be seen in the below image, similar flat panels also being employed on British Challenger 2 tanks serving in the conflict).

In addition to the Abrams' already heavy armament, some crews were also issued M136 AT4 shoulder-fired anti-tank weapons under the assumption that they might have to engage heavy armor in tight urban areas where the main gun couldn't be brought to bear. Some Abrams were also fitted with a secondary storage bin on the back of the existing bustle rack on the rear of the turret referred to as a bustle rack extension to enable the crew to carry more supplies and personal belongings.

The M1A2 is a further improvement of the M1A1 with a commander's independent thermal viewer and weapon station, position navigation equipment, digital data bus and a radio interface unit.  The M1A2 SEP (System Enhancement Package) added digital maps, FBCB2 (Force XXI Battlefield Command Brigade and Below) capabilities, and an improved cooling system to maintain crew compartment temperature with the addition of multiple computer systems to the M1A2 tank.

Further upgrades include depleted uranium armor for all variants, a system overhaul that returns all A1s to like-new condition (M1A1 AIM), a digital enhancement package for the A1 (M1A1D), a commonality program to standardize parts between the U.S. Army and the Marine Corps (M1A1HC) and an electronic upgrade for the A2 (M1A2 SEP).

During Operations Desert Shield and Desert Storm and for Bosnia, some M1A1s were modified with armor upgrades. The M1 can be equipped with mine plow and mine roller attachments if needed. The M1 chassis also serves as a basis for the Grizzly combat engineering vehicle and the M104 Wolverine heavy assault bridge.

Over 8,800 M1 and M1A1 tanks have been produced at a cost of US$2.35–$4.30 million per unit, depending on the variant.

Iraq War

Further combat was seen during 2003 when US forces invaded Iraq and deposed the Iraqi leader Saddam Hussein, in an invasion that lasted just 27 days (20 March to 15 April). M1 tanks proved instrumental in leading rapid attacks against the Iraqi military, as exemplified by the so-called 'Thunder Runs.' Abandoned Abrams were purposely destroyed by friendly fire to prevent recovery of vehicle or technology. Damages by 25 mm AP-DU, anti-armor RPG fire, and 12.7 mm rounds was encountered. There were no confirmed instances of anti-tank guided weapons or anti-tank mines striking the US MBTs. However, there is some speculation that Kornet ATGMs were used during the Battle of Najaf to knock out two Abrams, but Russian officials denied selling the weapon to Iraq. What is known is that the two Abrams were struck by unknown weapons, and their ammunition stores ignited. Nevertheless, both crews escaped without serious injury. Some Abrams were disabled by Iraqi infantrymen in ambushes employing short-range antitank rockets, such as the RPG-7. Although the RPG-7 is unable to penetrate the front and sides, the rear and top are vulnerable to this weapon. Frequently the rockets were fired at the tank tracks.

An Abrams was disabled near Karbala after an RPG warhead penetrated the rear engine compartment. There were two reported losses during the Battle of Baghdad, with one Abrams being put out of action after being struck by numerous medium caliber weapons, including 12.7mm rounds which ruptured a fuel bladder stored on an external rack. This started a fire that spread to the engine. On April 4, two Abrams were destroyed by anti-aircraft guns, while on April 5, another was hit by a recoilless rifle and set aflame. After repeated attempts to extinguish the fire, the decision was made to destroy or remove any sensitive equipment. Oil and .50 caliber rounds were scattered in the interior, the ammunition doors were opened and several thermite grenades ignited inside. Another M1 then fired a HEAT round in order to ensure the destruction of the disabled tank. The Abrams was completely disabled but still intact. Later, the Air Force bombed the tank to destroy it in place, and the Iraqi Information Ministry claimed credit for destroying it.

On March 31, 2003, an Abrams belonging to the US Marine Corps drove off the side of a bridge at night, dropping the tank into the Euphrates River and drowning the four crew members. On April 3, 2003, Abrams tanks destroyed seven Iraqi Lion of Babylon tanks in a point-blank skirmish (less than ) near Mahmoudiyah, with no losses for the U.S. side.

As of March 2005, approximately 80 Abrams tanks were forced out of action by enemy attacks; 63 were restored, while 17 were damaged beyond repair.

On June 6, 2006, two of the four soldiers in an Abrams crew were killed during combat operations in Baghdad, when an IED detonated near their M1A2. On August 2, 2006, an M1A1 commanded by US Marine Sgt. George M. Ulloa was hit by two IED's in Al Anbar Province, fatally injuring Sgt. Ulloa. Vulnerabilities exposed during urban combat in the Iraq War were addressed with the Tank Urban Survival Kit (TUSK) modifications, including armor upgrades and a gun shield, issued to some M1 Abrams tanks. It added protection in the rear and side of the tank and improved fighting ability and survival ability in urban environments. By December 2006 more than 530 Abrams tanks had been shipped back to the U.S. for repairs and upgrades.

Iraqi usage
It was reported that 28 Iraqi Army Abrams had been damaged in fighting with militants, five of them suffering full armor penetration when hit by ATGMs, in the period between 1 January and the end of May 2014; some were destroyed or damaged by militants placing explosive charges on or in the vehicles, highlighting the lack of adequate infantry support provided by Iraqi soldiers. In mid-2014, Iraqi Army Abrams tanks saw action when the Islamic State of Iraq and the Levant launched the June 2014 Northern Iraq offensive. Some Iraqi Army M1A1M tanks were destroyed in fighting against ISIL forces while an unknown number were captured intact. At least one ISIL-controlled M1A1M Abrams was reportedly used in the capture of the Mosul Dam in early August 2014. The Abrams suffered its first heavy losses at the hands of ISIL fighters against Iraqi-operated tanks through planted explosives, anti-tank missiles like the Kornet, and captured tanks later being destroyed by American airstrikes.  The chief cause of these losses was the poor training of Iraqi tank operators and lack of infantry coordination. About one-third of the 140 Abrams tanks delivered to the Iraqi Army had been captured or destroyed by ISIL.  By December 2014, the Iraqi Army only had about 40 operational Abrams left.  That month, the U.S. State Department approved the sale of another 175 Abrams to Iraq. The tanks may be fitted with additional protection features to defend against ISIL mine, roadside bomb, and other attacks including belly armor, reactive armor, 360-degree night vision sensors, mine-clearing blades and rollers, and a wide-area spotlight-equipped remotely operated gun mount.  If approved by Congress and funded by the Iraqi government, the improvements could be made within 18 months. By late 2015, some Iraqi Abrams tanks that had been dropped off at repair facilities were re-equipped with Russian heavy machine guns firing Iranian-manufactured ammunition, which may violate sales agreements prohibiting material usage by Shiite militias and the unsanctioned addition of foreign weapons.

From February to April 2016, Iraqi Army forces took back the town of Hit from ISIL.  Three Iraqi-operated M1A1 Abrams tanks took part in the operation, but two broke down early on.  The lone working Abrams performed exceptionally in combat, destroying enemy IEDs, punching holes in defenses, and maneuvering between multiple engagements.  U.S. forces monitoring Iraqi movements thought multiple tanks were in operation and were surprised to learn it had been working alone, crediting its success to the U.S.-trained crew.  The Abrams was nicknamed "The Beast" and has achieved somewhat of a folklore status among the Iraqi people.

In October 2017, Iraqi M1A1 Abrams tanks were cited by Kurdish sources as key to the Iraqi victory at the Battle of Kirkuk, as the Kurdish Peshmerga possessed no weaponry which could counter the tanks. However, later in the war at Alton-Kopri and Zumar, the Kurdish Peshmerga destroyed two Iraqi Abrams tanks in two days with the Milan missile system.

Yemeni Civil War (2015–present)
Starting from 2015, the Saudi Arabian Army deployed their M1 tanks during the Saudi Arabian-led intervention in Yemen. While the exact number of losses is not clear due to poor reporting from the conflict, it became clear that a certain number of Saudi tanks were lost to enemy forces using ATGMs, RPGs and mines. During summer 2016, a deal to sell 153 more M1 tanks to Saudi Arabia was revealed, with 20 of them being tagged as "battle damage replacements", implying that a similar number of Saudi M1 tanks were lost to the enemy.

Afghanistan
Operating tanks in Afghanistan can be difficult due to the terrain, although Canada and Denmark have deployed tanks to Afghanistan that have been specifically upgraded to fight in the tough Afghan environment. The U.S. sent 16 M1A1 Abrams tanks and 115 Marines to southern Afghanistan to support operations in the Helmand and Kandahar provinces in late 2010.

Future
During the 1980s and 1990s, the Block III main battle tank from the Armored Systems Modernization (ASM) program was expected to succeed the M1 Abrams family in the 1990s. The design has a unmanned turret with a 140 mm main gun, as well as improved protection. The end of the Cold War would ultimately end the program. The tracked M8 Armored Gun System was conceived as a possible supplement for the Abrams in U.S. service for low-intensity conflict in the early 1990s. Prototypes were made but the program was canceled. The 8-wheeled M1128 Mobile Gun System was designed to supplement the Abrams in U.S. service for low-intensity conflict. It has been introduced into service and, though mobile, it has proven to be quite vulnerable.

The U.S. Army's Future Combat Systems' XM1202 Mounted Combat System was to replace the Abrams in U.S. service and was in late stages of development when funding for the program was cut from the DoD's budget.

In September 2009, the Army Times and Marine Corps Times published reports that US Army researchers have begun the process of designing a version of the Abrams that will carry the M1A3 label.  According to the reports, the Army is seeking to reduce the weight of the vehicle to approximately 60 tons from its current operational weight of roughly 75 tons.  Additionally, the M1A3 may incorporate a new generation of advanced networking capabilities and enhanced armor protection.  Other improvements are to include a lighter 120 mm gun, added road wheels with improved suspension, a more durable track, lighter armor, long-range precision armaments, and infrared camera and laser detectors.  A new internal computer system is also planned, with current cabling replaced by fiber-optic cables that can reduce weight by two tons. The Army currently aimed to build prototypes by 2014 and to begin to field the first combat-ready M1A3s by 2017, however due to financial shortcomings and delays, there has yet to be a single tank produced (To the public's knowledge.)

Production 
The military planned to close the M1 Abrams factory in Ohio from 2013 to 2016 to save over US$1 billion.  In 2017 the plant would reopen to upgrade existing tanks.  The downside to the three-year plant closing is the loss of the skilled human capital required to build the M1.  These types of job skills must be learned on the job as the building is too unique to offer any type of educational program in a trade school environment.

By August 2013, Congress had allocated $181 million for buying parts and upgrading Abrams systems to mitigate industrial base risks and sustain development and production capability.  Congress and General Dynamics were criticized for redirecting money to keep production lines open and accused of "forcing the Army to buy tanks it didn't need."  General Dynamics asserted that a four-year shutdown would cost $1.1–1.6 billion to reopen the line, depending on the length of the shutdown, whether machinery would be kept operating, and whether the plant's components would be completely removed.  They contended that the move was to upgrade Army National Guard units to expand a "pure fleet" and maintain production of identified "irreplaceable" subcomponents; a prolonged shutdown could cause their makers to lose their ability to produce them and foreign tank sales were not guaranteed to keep production lines open.  Even though money is being spent to protect the industrial base, some feel those strategic choices should not be made by members of Congress, especially those with the facilities in their district. There is still risk of production gaps even with production extended through 2015; with funds awarded before recapitalization is needed, budgetary pressures may push planned new upgrades for the Abrams from 2017 to 2019. In December 2014, Congress again allocated $120 million, against the wishes of the Army, for Abrams upgrades including improving gas mileage by integrating an auxiliary power unit to decrease idle time fuel consumption and upgrading the tank's sights and sensors.

At the end of 2016, tank production/refurbishment had fallen to a rate of one per month, with less than 100 workers on site. However, the Trump administration entered office in 2017 and made rebuilding the military a priority, thus the Lima Army Tank Plant was given a new lease on life. It was reported in 2018 that the Army had ordered 135 tanks re-built to new standards, employment was over 500 workers and expected to rise to 1,000.

Notes

References

Main battle tanks of the United States